The Valiant Hombre is a 1948 American Western film directed by Wallace Fox, written by Adele Buffington, and starring Duncan Renaldo, Leo Carrillo, John Litel, Barbara Billingsley, John James and Stanley Andrews. It was released on December 15, 1948, by United Artists.

Plot

Cast 
Duncan Renaldo as the Cisco Kid
Leo Carrillo as Pancho
John Litel as Lon Lansdell
Barbara Billingsley as Linda Mason
John James as Paul Mason
Stanley Andrews as Sheriff George Dodge
Guy Beach as Old Joe Haskins
Gene Roth as Pete 
Ralph Peters as Deputy Clay
Terry Frost as Henchman Brett
Lee 'Lasses' White as Whiskers
Frank Ellis as Henchman Duffy
George DeNormand as Henchman Lefty
Daisy as Daisy the Dog

References

External links 
 

1948 films
American black-and-white films
Films directed by Wallace Fox
Films scored by Albert Glasser
United Artists films
American Western (genre) films
1948 Western (genre) films
Adaptations of works by O. Henry
Cisco Kid
1940s English-language films
1940s American films